Myrioblephara is a genus of moths in the family Geometridae first described by Warren in 1893.

Species
Myrioblephara flexilinea Warren New Guinea
Myrioblephara mollis Warren New Guinea
Myrioblephara muscosa Warren New Guinea
Myrioblephara subtrita Warren New Guinea
Myrioblephara simplaria (Swinhoe, 1894) north-eastern Himalayas, Sundaland, Philippines, Sulawesi, southern Moluccas, New Guinea
Myrioblephara bifida Holloway, 1993 Borneo
Myrioblephara pallibasis Holloway, 1993 Borneo, Peninsular Malaysia, Sumatra
Myrioblephara geniculata (Prout, 1932) Borneo
Myrioblephara pingasoides Warren
Myrioblephara rubrifusa Warren, 1893 Sikkim

References

Boarmiini